Deh Now (also Romanized as Deh-e Now and Deh-i-Nau) is a village in Harabarjan Rural District, Marvast District, Khatam County, Yazd Province, Iran. At the 2006 census, its population was 20, in 4 families.

References 

Populated places in Khatam County